John Collins-Muhammad, Jr. (born 1991), is an American activist and politician from the state of Missouri. He served on the Board of Alderman of the City of St. Louis representing the 21st Ward where he represented portions of North City. Collins-Muhammad was elected to his first term in April 2017 at the age of 25, which makes him the youngest person ever to be elected and the first Muslim ever elected to the St. Louis Board of Alderman. He was re-elected in April 2021 garnishing nearly 60% of the vote in his ward. He resigned in May 2022 after pleading guilty to federal corruption and bribery charges.  Although he is a member of the Democratic Party, he was a frequent critic of the party.

Early life
Collins-Muhammad was raised in North City, St. Louis, Missouri in the Greater Ville Neighborhood. An alum of St. Mary's High School, He went on to complete his studies in political science and history at the only two HBCU’s in Missouri; Lincoln University in Jefferson City and Harris-Stowe State University in Saint Louis. Collins-Muhammad's younger sister, Kimberly-Ann Collins is a state representative. His mother, Dr. LaTonia Smith, is President at Harris-Stowe State University in St. Louis. 

While in college, Collins-Muhammad served as a Legislative Intern to former Missouri state representatives Rodney Hubbard, Talibden El-Amin, and State Senator Jamilah Nasheed. He worked in the St. Louis City License Collector's office under Michael McMillan.
 
Collins-Muhammad is a practicing Muslim and is a member of the Nation of Islam under Louis Farrakhan. He is known to be an assistant minister at the Nation of Islam's temple in St. Louis. The Southern Poverty Law Center describes the Nation of Islam as a Black nationalist group with its theology of innate black superiority and antisemitic. The Nation of Islam has over 200 mosques and groups throughout the World and is anchored in Chicago, Illinois. Collins-Muhammad also has strong ties to the St. Louis branch of the Moorish Science Temple, a controversial Islamic sect that was notably headed by Jerry Lewis-Bey. The Moorish Science Temple has branches in every major U.S. city with its headquarters in Chicago, Illinois.

Collins-Muhammad is also an active member of the 100 Black Men of America, Inc., and the NAACP.

Political career
Collins-Muhammad was elected to his first term as Alderman for the city's 21st Ward in April 2017 following Alderman Antonio D. French's vacation of the seat to run for Mayor. At age 25, he is the youngest person ever to be elected Alderman in the city's history and the first Muslim. 

In the Board of Aldermen, Collins-Muhammad currently serves or has served on the following committees;
 Ways & Means
 Public Safety
 Housing & Urban Development
 Transportation & Commerce
 Public Utilities
 Intergovernmental Affairs

In 2017, Collins-Muhammad proposed a major redevelopment plan on Natural Bridge Avenue; one of the city's most derelict and less economically developed Corridors. Natural Bridge Avenue sits in the middle of North St. Louis, and is populated by crime, a decreasing housing market, and vacant buildings. Collins-Muhammad's plan included a blighting, and a 15-year tax abatement on property on Natural Bridge Avenue, and additional funding in Tax Increment Financing to developers.

In 2018, in response to high freezing temperatures, Collins-Muhammad gained mass local media attention for opening up an emergency homeless shelter at St. Peter community center in his ward. The emergency shelter houses up to 150 people per night and is operated 24 hours a day. St. Peter community center is owned by St. Peter African Methodist Episcopal church in St. Louis. Collins-Muhammad also wrote an open letter to the Missouri Governor to call attention to the homeless epidemic in St. Louis.

Collins-Muhammad sponsored legislation creating the one dollar housing program; a year-long pilot program aimed at selling residential properties owned by the city's real estate department known as Land Re-utilization Authority for $1.00. The legislation established a lease program in which interested developers could obtain an 18-month lease on the property, and undertake a rehabilitation that would need to be completed in that time frame.

Collins-Muhammad introduced a Board Bill creating “ban the box”, prohibiting employers in the City of St. Louis, Missouri, from basing job hiring or promotion decisions on applicants’ criminal histories. The Ordinance will take effect on January 1, 2021, for employers with at least 10 employees. Under the law, applicants with criminal histories are less likely to be considered for an available job when the information is included on an initial job application, and that revealing a criminal history on an initial job application often results in an applicant's elimination from consideration.

Collins-Muhammad was re-elected in 2021 to another term.

In the 2021-2022 legislative session, Collins-Muhammad served on the special COVID-19 response committee, and was successful in playing a vital role in passing legislation allocating the American Rescue Plan Act of 2021, which allocated more than $300 Million in federal funding to the City for COVID relief measures in the form of investing in housing development, grants monies for the city's Department of Health, and more than $50 Million for utility, rental, and mortgage assistance for residents. 

Prior to running for Alderman, Collins-Muhammad, in 2016 ran unsuccessfully for Missouri state representative of the 77th district placing second in a four-way race losing narrowly to Steve Roberts, Jr.

Protests erupted after a white police officer Jason Stockley was acquitted for murder in the 2011 shooting death of African-American, Anthony Lamar Smith. Collins-Muhammad was one of the organizers of many protest demonstrations which led to mass arrest and police militia response. Collins-Muhammad gained widespread controversy for presenting an honorary resolution remembering Smith. Collins-Muhammad led the Board of Aldermen in unanimously approving and passing the resolution which sparked outrage from the St. Louis police officers association.
 
Collins-Muhammad was arrested by the Florissant Police Department for failure to pay parking & traffic tickets and driving with a suspended license in Fall 2018. Collins-Muhammad had warrants for traffic violations in three St. Louis area municipalities.

Ferguson Protest
Collins-Muhammad was a leader in the protest movement following the 2014 death of teenager Michael Brown in Ferguson, Missouri. He expressed criticism of police militarization and the way the crisis was handled within the community. During the protests, Collins-Muhammad was among the protesters who were tear-gassed by law enforcement and policing agencies. He assisted in the organizing of rallies, events, and protest demonstrations calling for the resignation of Ferguson Police Chief Tom Jackson and the immediate arrest of police officer Darren Wilson. He was fired in 2014 from the Village of Uplands Park in St. Louis County for making inflammatory remarks on national television about the shooting of two St. Louis area police officers. Fellow Ferguson protester and Black Lives Matter surrogate Tory Russell is a known associate of Collins-Muhammad and served as his campaign manager.

Bribery conviction 
On May 25, 2022 Collins-Muhammad along with longtime Board of Aldermen President Lewis E. Reed and 22nd Ward Alderman Jeffrey Boyd were indicted by federal grand jury for felony corruption and bribery charges. Collins-Muhammad, Reed, and Boyd all pled guilty in August 2022.

Political offices

References

1991 births
American civil rights activists
Living people
African-American Muslims
African-American people in Missouri politics
Members of the St. Louis Board of Aldermen
Missouri Democrats
Missouri politicians convicted of crimes
Members of the Nation of Islam
21st-century African-American people